= Homotropic =

Homotropic may refer to:

- Homotropic allosteric modulation of enzymes
- Homotropic modulation of the chemical synapse
